The education movement in east Pakistan (now Bangladesh) was a movement circulated by students and peoples to cancel the odd education policy applied by Ayub Khan.

References

External links

History of East Pakistan
History of Pakistan